Treskovo is a rural locality (a selo) in Kabansky District, Republic of Buryatia, Russia. The population was 1,380 as of 2010. There are 18 streets.

Geography 
Treskovo is located 22 km east of Kabansk (the district's administrative centre) by road. Selenga is the nearest rural locality.

References 

Rural localities in Kabansky District